The Legitimist Party (PL) was a conservative Nicaraguan political party, the first in its country. The power base of the Legitimist Party was in Granada. The Legitimists were opposed to the Democrats. After several years of civil war between the Legitimists and the Democrats, a provisional government was established in June 1857 which had as its joint leaders the legitimist Tomás Martínez and the democrat Máximo Jerez.

The Nicaraguan Conservative Party defines itself as a continuation of the Legitimist Party and traces its history back to PLs foundation in 1823.

References

Sources
Info
Rutahsa Adventures' Nicaragua-Honduras Excursion 2005! 
Publications | International IDEA

1838 establishments in Nicaragua
1857 disestablishments in Nicaragua
Conservative parties in Nicaragua
Defunct political parties in Nicaragua
Political parties disestablished in 1857
Political parties established in 1838